Than Phu Ying Poonsuk Banomyong (January 2, 1913 – May 12, 2007) was the wife of former Thai Prime Minister Pridi Banomyong. In November 1952 Poonsuk was arrested on charges of subversion under the government of Plaek Phibunsongkhram and was held in custody until February, 1953. She joined her husband in exile in China, until they were able to move to France.

Family

Poonsuk's great-grandmother, Boonma, was the sister of Pin, who was also the great-grandmother of her husband Pridi. Their parents, Kroen and Kaew, were of indigenous Thai ancestry.

Poonsuk and Pridi had six children: Lalida, Parl, Suda, Sukprida, Dusadee and Wani.

Died
Poonsuk returned to Thailand from Paris in 1986, and died on May 12, 2007.

References

External links
 Pridi Banomyong - the father of Thai democracy
 Mourners remember Thanpuying Phoonsuk

2007 deaths
Poonsuk Banomyong
1913 births